Ten Thousand Days is a 1967 Hungarian drama film directed by Ferenc Kósa. It was entered into the 1967 Cannes Film Festival where Kósa won the award for Best Director. The film was chosen to be part of the Budapest Twelve, a list of Hungarian films considered the best in 1968.

Cast
 Tibor Molnár as Széles István
 Gyöngyi Bürös as Juli
 János Koltai as Fülöp Bánó
 János Rajz as Balogh
 János Görbe as Bócza József
 Sándor Siménfalvy as Sándor bácsi (as Siménfalvi Sándor)
 Anna Nagy as Mihály felesége
 László Nyers as Csere Mihály
 Péter Haumann as Rendõr
 Ida Siménfalvy as Széles mama (as Siménfalvi Ida)
 István Széles
 András Kozák as Ifj.Széles István
 Nóra Káldi as A rendõr felesége

References

External links

1967 films
1967 drama films
1960s Hungarian-language films
Hungarian black-and-white films
Films directed by Ferenc Kósa
Hungarian drama films